Walter George Smith School is a former school building located in the Point Breeze neighborhood of Philadelphia, Pennsylvania. It was designed by Irwin T. Catharine and built in 1924–1925. It is a four-story, brick building with limestone trim in the Late Gothic Revival-style. It features two projecting ends, main entrance with enclosed porch and Gothic arch, Gothic arched windows, and battlement parapet.

It was added to the National Register of Historic Places in 1986. The school was closed in 2013, and as of 2016 was in the process of being converted to apartments.

References

School buildings on the National Register of Historic Places in Philadelphia
Gothic Revival architecture in Pennsylvania
School buildings completed in 1925
Defunct schools in Pennsylvania
South Philadelphia
1925 establishments in Pennsylvania